Wayne Wapeemukwa is a Canadian film director and screenwriter of Métis descent from Vancouver, British Columbia. He is most noted for his feature film debut Luk'Luk'I (2017), which won the Toronto International Film Festival Award for Best Canadian First Feature Film at the 2017 Toronto International Film Festival and the Directors Guild of Canada's Discovery Award.

Education and filmmaking
Wapeemukwa participated in his high-school film program and has been influenced and inspired, since childhood, by Chelsea McMullan. He graduated from the University of British Columbia  with a bachelor's degree and is pursuing a Master's degree in Philosophy and psychoanalysis at the New School for Social Research.

Wapemukwa also works as a public-school teacher and research assistant.

Angel Gates is Wapeemukwa's muse, having first consulted on research for his short films and later starring, and being featured, in four of his documentary films.

Filmography
Limp Clown - 2010
Blood Job - 2010
Street Spirit - 2011
Spiritualized - 2011
Foreclosure - 2013
Weeper: Father - 2014
Luk'Luk'I: Mother - 2014
Balmoral Hotel - 2015
Srorrim - 2016
Luk'Luk'I - 2017

Awards

 2015, Balmoral Hotel was named to the Toronto International Film Festival's Canada's Top Ten list for short films.
 2017, Luk'Luk'I, Toronto International Film Festival Award for Best Canadian First Feature Film
 2017, Luk'Luk'I, Directors Guild of Canada's Discovery Award

References

External links

Canadian male screenwriters
Film directors from Vancouver
Writers from Vancouver
Métis filmmakers
Living people
Year of birth missing (living people)
Métis writers
Canadian Métis people